In mathematics, a quadratic differential on a Riemann surface is a section of the symmetric square of the holomorphic cotangent bundle. If the section is holomorphic, then the quadratic differential is said to be holomorphic. The vector space of holomorphic quadratic differentials on a Riemann surface has a natural interpretation as the cotangent space to the Riemann moduli space, or Teichmüller space.

Local form

Such a "local" quadratic differential is holomorphic if and only if  is holomorphic.

Relation to abelian differentials

If  is an abelian differential on a Riemann surface, then  is a quadratic differential.

Singular Euclidean structure

A holomorphic quadratic differential  determines a Riemannian metric  on the complement of its zeroes. Since   is holomorphic, the curvature of this metric is zero. Thus, a holomorphic quadratic differential defines a flat metric on the complement of the set of  such that .

References

 Kurt Strebel, Quadratic differentials. Ergebnisse der Mathematik und ihrer Grenzgebiete (3), 5. Springer-Verlag, Berlin, 1984. xii + 184 pp. .
 Y. Imayoshi and M. Taniguchi, M. An introduction to Teichmüller spaces. Translated and revised from the Japanese version by the authors. Springer-Verlag, Tokyo, 1992. xiv + 279 pp. .
 Frederick P. Gardiner, Teichmüller Theory and Quadratic Differentials. Wiley-Interscience, New York, 1987. xvii + 236 pp. .

Complex manifolds